Attorney General Wilson may refer to:

Alan Wilson (South Carolina politician) (born 1973), Attorney General of South Carolina
Alexander Wilson (Wisconsin politician) (1833–1888), Attorney General of Wisconsin
Charles Wilson (British Columbia politician) (1841–1924), Attorney General of British Columbia
Edmund Wilson Sr. (1863–1923), Attorney General of New Jersey
Fred O. Wilson (1903–1983), Attorney General of Arizona
George P. Wilson (1840–1920), Attorney General of Minnesota
John Frank Wilson (1846–1911), Attorney General of the Territory of Arizona
Karen Freeman-Wilson (born 1960), Attorney General of Indiana
Margaret Wilson (born 1947), Attorney-General of New Zealand
Scott Wilson (judge) (1870–1942), Attorney General of Maine
Walter Horatio Wilson (1839–1902), Attorney-General of Queensland
Will Wilson (Texas politician) (1912–2005), Attorney General of Texas

See also
Jody Wilson-Raybould (born 1971), Attorney General of Canada
General Wilson (disambiguation)